The Requin-class submarines were a class of nine diesel-electric attack submarines built for the French Navy in the mid-1920s. Most saw action during World War II for the Vichy French Navy or the Free French Naval Forces. Nine ships of this type were built in the shipyards of Brest, Cherbourg and Toulon between 1923 and 1928. The class was part of the French Marine Nationale, serving in the Mediterranean Sea. All member ships took part in World War II, fighting on both sides of the conflict; Four were captured by Italian forces and sunk by the Allies. Only one ship survived the war - , decommissioned shortly after the war's end.

Design
The Requin class was ordered as part of the French fleet's expansion program during 1922 and 1923. The class was designed with additional experience gained from examining of ex-German U-boats received as war Reparations. The ships were destined for reconnaissance and service in colonies, to attack the shipping lanes of the potential enemies. The class had a large range and diving depth; it suffered, however, from poor maneuverability and speed on the surface. The ships were designed by Jean-Jacques Roquebert.

Propulsion while surfaced was provided by two  diesel motors built by the Swiss manufacturer Sulzer or by Schneider and two  electric motors.

Of the nine Requin-class ships, two were built in Brest, five in Cherbourg and two in Toulon. The ships were laid down between 1923 and 1924, launched between 1924 and 1927 and were commissioned in the French Marine Nationale between 1926 and 1928. The units received the pennant numbers Q115 to Q120 and Q127 through Q129.

Ships

Service 

From 1935 to 1937, all ships underwent a major overhaul. At the outbreak of World War II, the ships served in the Mediterranean Sea, forming part of the 4th Submarine Flotilla stationed in Bizerte. After the Armistice was concluded between France and Germany, all ships except Morse, sunk off Tunisia on June 16, 1940, and Narval, which went to the Free French Naval Forces, joined the Vichy French navy. On June 25, 1941, during Operation Exporter, Souffleur was torpedoed and sunk off Beirut, Lebanon, by the British submarine . On November 27, 1942, during the scuttling of the French fleet in Toulon, Caïman was scuttled, later raised by the Italians and on March 11, 1944, sunk again by American planes. Marsouin was not scuttled and escaped from Toulon to join the Free French Naval Forces and served until 1946.

 
On 8 December 1942 in Bizerte, German forces captured four ships of the Requin class: Phoque, Requin, Espadon and Dauphin, and then handed them over to Italy. In commission with the Regia Marina, they received the designations FR. 111, FR.113, FR.114 and FR.115, respectively, and were rebuilt into submarine transports. Torpedo and artillery armaments were removed from the ships, leaving only two 13.2 mm guns; they were able to transport 50 tons of cargo and 145 tons of fuel. Only the rebuilding of Phoque (FR.111) was completed, but during its first voyage under the Italian flag on February 28, 1943, the ship was sunk near Syracuse by American planes. After the conclusion of the ceasefire with Italy by the Allies, the remaining ships were scuttled in September 1943 by Italians or Germans.

References

Citations 

 
 
Submarine classes
Ship classes of the French Navy